is a Japanese television drama adapted from the Young Scenario Prize-winning screenplay Kurage Marriage by Motoko Usuda. The series aired on the Getsuku time-slot from October 18 to December 20, 2010 on Fuji TV. The drama's slogan was "Itsuwari no Ai Kara, Shinjitsu no Ai e" . The series stars Yutaka Takenouchi, in his first Getsuku drama lead role in nine years, since Dekichatta Kekkon (2001), and Aya Ueto, in her second supporting role in a Getsuku drama and first since Konkatsu! (2009).

The theme song of the drama, "Ryūsei," is performed by folk rock duo Kobukuro. The series premiere, which was extended by 15 minutes, earned a rating of 13.6%.

Series synopsis
Takenouchi plays an aquarium employee named Kengo, who possesses a secret he would sacrifice everything in order to protect, while Ueto portrays Risa, a young woman working in the sex trade in order to pay off her brother's debt. These two characters, both full of despair, meet each other and end up entering a contract marriage purely for its benefits. However, as they overcome various troubles, their relationship begins turning into true love.

Cast and characters

Main cast
 Yutaka Takenouchi as Kengo Okada (37), an employee of the Shin-Enoshima aquarium who enters a contract marriage with Risa.
 Aya Ueto as Risa Makihara (26), a young woman working at the image club Sei Marin Gakuen under the alias Milk.
 Kie Kitano as Maria Okada (17), Kengo's younger sister and high school student who suffers from a liver illness.
 Shota Matsuda as Dr. Ryō Kamiya (28), Maria's attending physician.
 Goro Inagaki as Shuichi Makihara (35), Risa's older brother who has ruined her life for the sake of money.
 Haruna Kawaguchi as Mizuki Yasuda (17), Maria's best friend and schoolmate.
 Akito Kiriyama as Ryōta Sawamura (17), an in-patient at the same hospital as Maria who suffers from the same liver illness.
 Tetta Sugimoto as Junji Kawamoto (42), Kengo's friend and employee of the Shin-Enoshima aquarium .
 Chisun as Chizuru Kawamoto (32), an employee of the Shin-Enoshima aquarium. She is married to Junji Kawamoto.
 Shingo Nakagawa as Yūya Kashiwabara (27), an employee of the Shin-Enoshima aquarium.
 Hiromi Kitagawa as Rumi Nakashima (29), the nurse in charge of Maria and Ryōta.
 Yuka Itaya as Minako Aizawa (37), Kengo's fiancée. She works at a hotel.
 Mieko Harada as Kazuko Okada (57), Kengo and Maria's mother.

Recurring cast
Ken Mitsuishi as Shirai, the manager of the image club Sei Marin Gakuen (episodes 1–3).
Kazumasa Taguchi as Dr. Taninaka (episodes 1, 4, 7, 9).
Takeru Shibuya as a child at the aquarium (episodes 1, 9).
Saori as Kotomi Sawamura, Ryōta's sister (episodes 3, 6, 8).
Hijiri Sakurai as a ward office clerk (episodes 3, 9).
Natsuhi Ueno as Saeko Iwai, a tabloid reporter (episodes 7–9).

Guest cast
Shunsuke Daito as Makoto Fujishiro, Risa's boyfriend (episode 1).
Shihō Harumi as a customer at Sei Marin Gakuen (episode 1).
Yuzuki Amano as a child at the aquarium (episode 1).
Raishin Kodama as Kōhei, Kengo and Maria's uncle (episode 1).
Hisako Matsuyama as Reiko, Kengo and Maria's aunt (episode 1).
Kinpei Hayashiya as himself, a rakugo performer (episode 2).
Eihei Hayashiya as himself, a rakugo performer (episode 2).
Petako Hayashiya as herself, a rakugo performer (episode 2).
Michiko Yamamoto as the lady at the watch shop (episode 5).
Kaoru Sawayama as a hospital nurse (episode 5).
Yūki Mihara as a TV presenter (episode 5).
Shōgo Asari as Iwai's cameraman (episode 9).
Midoriko as the Aquapet Joy shopkeeper (episode 10).
Fuku Suzuki as a customer at Aquapet Joy (episode 10).
Arisa Isano as a customer at Aquapet Joy (episode 10).

Episodes and ratings

Awards

References

External links
 
 Nagareboshi Staff Blog
 

Japanese drama television series
Japanese romance television series
Serial drama television series
2010 Japanese television series debuts
2010 Japanese television series endings
Fuji TV dramas
Aquariums in fiction